The Jews of Kurdistan are the Mizrahi Jewish communities native to the geographic region of Kurdistan, roughly covering parts of northwestern Iran, northern Iraq, northeastern Syria and southeastern Turkey. Kurdish Jews lived as closed ethnic communities until they were expelled from Arab and Muslim states from the 1940s–1950s onward. The community largely speaks Judeo-Aramaic and Kurdish languages, with the Kurmanji dialect of Iraqi Kurdistan being the most prevalent. As Kurdish Jews natively adhere to Judaism and originate from the Middle East, Mizrahi Hebrew is used for liturgy. Many Kurdish Jews, especially the ones who hail from Iraq, went through a Sephardic Jewish blending during the 18th century.

In the present-day, the overwhelming majority of Kurdistan's Jewish population resides in the State of Israel, with the community's presence coming as a direct result of either the Jewish exodus from Muslim states or the making of Aliyah by stragglers in the following decades (see Kurdish Jews in Israel).

History

Middle Ages
According to the memoirs of Benjamin of Tudela and Pethahiah of Regensburg, there were about 100 Jewish settlements and substantial Jewish population in Kurdistan in the 12th century.  Benjamin of Tudela also gives the account of David Alroi, the messianic leader from central Kurdistan, who rebelled against the Persian Seljuk Sultan Muktafi and had plans to lead the Jews back to Jerusalem. These travellers also report of well-established and wealthy Jewish communities in Mosul, which was the commercial and spiritual center of Kurdistan. Many Jews fearful of approaching crusaders, had fled from Syria and Palestine to Babylonia and Kurdistan. The Jews of Mosul enjoyed some degree of autonomy in managing their own community.

Ottoman era
Tanna'it Asenath Barzani, who lived in Mosul from 1590 to 1670, was the daughter of Rabbi Samuel Barzani of Kurdistan. She later married Jacob Mizrahi Rabbi of Amadiyah (in Iraqi Kurdistan) who lectured at a yeshiva. She was famous for her knowledge of the Torah, Talmud, Kabbalah and Jewish law. After the early death of her husband, she became the head of the yeshiva at Amadiyah, and eventually was recognized as the chief instructor of Torah in Kurdistan. She was called tanna'it (female Talmudic scholar), practiced mysticism, and was reputed to have known the secret names of God. Asenath is also well known for her poetry and excellent command of the Hebrew language. She wrote a long poem of lament and petition in the traditional rhymed metrical form. Her poems are among the few examples of the early modern Hebrew texts written by women.

Kurdish Jews had lived in Kashan, Iran and many Jews migrated to Turkey during the 1700s to 1800s. They were active in trade in rural villages in Turkey, regions like Gaziantep and Malatya had a substantial Jewish populations. They were usually quite concealed but did not have any negative interactions with other communities. 

Immigration of Kurdish Jews to the Land of Israel initiated during the late 16th century, with a community of rabbinic scholars arriving to Safed, Galilee, and a Kurdish Jewish quarter had been established there as a result. The thriving period of Safed however ended in 1660, with Druze power struggles in the region and an economic decline.

Modern times

Since the early 20th century some Kurdish Jews had been active in the Zionist movement. One of the most famous members of Lehi (Freedom Fighters of Israel) was Moshe Barazani, whose family immigrated from Iraqi Kurdistan and settled in Jerusalem in the late 1920s.

The vast majority of Kurdish Jews were forced out of Iraqi Kurdistan and evacuated to Israel in the early 1950s, together with the Iraqi Jewish community. Almost all the Kurdish Jews of Iranian Kurdistan relocated mostly to Israel as well in the same period.

The Times of Israel reported on September 30, 2013: "Today, there are almost 200,000 Kurdish Jews in Israel, about half of whom live in Jerusalem. There are also over 30 agricultural villages throughout the country that were founded by Kurdish Jews."

On October 17, 2015, the Kurdistan Regional Government named Sherzad Omar Mamsani as the representative of the Jewish community at the Ministry of Endowment and Religious Affairs, but he was dismissed following assertions by the Jewish community in Israel that there were no Jews remaining in the Kurdistan Region. However the sending of Hanukkah kits to Jews in arab countries including Kurdistan indicate there may be Jewish rements hiding there.

Historiography
One of the main problems in the history and historiography of the Jews of Kurdistan was the lack of written history and the lack of documents and historical records. During the 1930s, a German-Jewish ethnographer, Erich Brauer, began interviewing members of the community. His assistant, Raphael Patai, published the results of his research in Hebrew. The book,  (Jerusalem, 1940), was translated into English in the 1990s. Israeli scholar Mordechai Zaken wrote a Ph.D. dissertation and a book, using written, archival and oral sources that traces and reconstructs the relationships between the Jews and their Kurdish masters or chieftains also known as Aghas). He interviewed 56 Kurdish Jews altogether conducting hundreds of interviews, thus saving their memoires from being lost forever. He interviewed Kurdish Jews mainly from six towns (Zahko, Aqrah, Amadiya, Dohuk, Sulaimaniya and Shinno/Ushno/Ushnoviyya), as well as from dozens of villages, mostly in the region of Bahdinan. His study unveils new sources, reports and vivid tales that form a new set of historical records on the Jews and the tribal Kurdish society. His PhD thesis was commented by members of the PhD judicial committee and along with the book upon which it has been translated into several Middle Eastern languages, including Arabic, Sorani, Kurmanji, as well as French.

Gallery

See also
 History of the Jews in Iraq
 Israel–Kurdistan Region relations
 Jewish ethnic divisions
 Jewish diaspora
 Judeo-Aramaic
 Northeastern Neo-Aramaic
 Dönmeh

Bibliography
 Mordechai Zaken, "Jewish Subjects and their tribal Chieftains in Kurdistan: A study in Survival," Jewish Identities in a Changing World, 9 (Boston: Brill Publishers, 2007)
 Brauer, Erich; Patai, Raphael, The Jews of Kurdistan. (Detroit: Wayne State University Press, 1993).
 Asenath Barzani, "Asenath's Petition", First published in Hebrew by Jacob Mann, ed., in Texts and Studies in Jewish History and Literature, vol.1, Hebrew Union College Press, Cincinnati, 1931. Translation by Peter Cole.
 Yona Sabar, The Folk Literature of the Kurdistani Jews (New Haven: Yale University Press, 1982).
 Ariel Sabar, My Father's Paradise: A Son’s Search for His Jewish Past in Kurdish Iraq.  Illustrated. 332 pp. Algonquin Books of Chapel Hill.  Biography & study of Yona Beh Sabagha = Yona Sabar, native scholar of this community and its language.  Reviewed in The New York Times, Oct. 12, 2008 and The Washington Post, Oct. 26, 2008.
 Mahir Ünsal Eriş, Kürt Yahudileri - Din, Dil, Tarih, (Kurdish Jews) In Turkish, Kalan Publishing, Ankara, 2006
 Hasan-Rokem, G., Hess, T. and Kaufman, S.,  Defiant Muse: Hebrew Feminist Poems from Antiquity: A Bilingual Anthology, Publisher: Feminist Press, 1999, . (see page 65, 16th century/Kurdistan and Asenath's Petition)
 Rabbi Asenath Barzani in Jewish Storytelling Newsletter, Vol.15, No.3, Summer 2000
 The Jews of Kurdistan Yale Israel Journal, No. 6 (Spr. 2005).
Judaism in Encyclopaedia Kurdistanica

References

External links

 IKN - Israel Kurdistan Network
 Jewish Encyclopedia: Kurdistan - Customs of Jewish community

Jewish Kurdish history
Jewish ethnic groups
 
Sephardi Jews topics
 
Ethnic groups in Kurdistan